Paul Robert John Bryson (born 6 July 1968) is a former English cricketer.  Bryson was a right-handed batsman who bowled right-arm off break.  He was born in Liverpool, Lancashire.

Bryson made his debut for Cheshire in the 1994 Minor Counties Championship against Dorset.  Bryson played Minor counties cricket for Cheshire from 1994 to 2001, including 51 Minor Counties Championship matches and 24 MCCA Knockout Trophy matches.  In 1995, he made his List A debut against Essex in the NatWest Trophy.  He played eight further List A matches for Cheshire, the last coming against Lincolnshire in the 2nd round of the 2003 Cheltenham & Gloucester Trophy which was held in 2002.  In his nine List A matches, he scored 138 runs at a batting average of 17.25, with a single half century high score of 59 coming against Lincolnshire in 2002, with his steady half century coming from 84 balls before he was dismissed by Martyn Dobson.

He played Second XI cricket for the Lancashire Second XI in 1995.

References

External links
Paul Bryson at ESPNcricinfo
Paul Bryson at CricketArchive

1968 births
Living people
Cricketers from Liverpool
English cricketers
Cheshire cricketers